Worzel may refer to:

 Worzel Gummidge, a fictional scarecrow created by Barbara Euphan Todd
 J. Lamar Worzel (1919–2008), American geophysicist
 nickname of Jeff Rich (born 1953), former drummer for the English rock band Status Quo
 Worzel Gummidge was the nickname of the politician Michael Foot (1913-2010)

See also 
 Wurzel (disambiguation)